Operation RY was the Imperial Japanese plan to invade and occupy Nauru and Ocean islands in the south Pacific during the Pacific conflict of World War II. The operation was originally set to be executed in May 1942 immediately following Operation MO and before Operation MI, which resulted in the Battle of Midway. The primary reason for the operation was to exploit the islands' supplies of phosphate. After a postponement due to interference by enemy forces, the operation was completed in August 1942.

Background
Nauru and Ocean Islands were isolated but rich with phosphate deposits; the deposits were identified around 1900. Nauru was under Australian mandate control, and Ocean Island (or Banaba) was headquarters of the British Gilbert and Ellice Islands Colony. In both places, the Melbourne-based British Phosphate Commissioners (BPC) had been running the phosphate mining since 1919, under the Nauru Island Agreement. The phosphate deposits were mined for making fertilisers, ammunition and explosives.

The German auxiliary cruisers  and  sank five merchant ships and bombarded the island causing damage to the phosphate mining, disrupting the Allied production of phosphate. Following the raids, the Australian Commonwealth Naval Board requested that the British Admiralty redeploy Australian naval units to meet the threat posed by raiders. The armed merchant cruiser  arrived off Ocean Island on 4 January 1941, and Australian and New Zealand warships maintained a continual presence off the islands during the subsequent months. A naval company and two field guns were deployed to each island. The attacks also led to the introduction of convoys between Australia and New Zealand.

In late February 1942, as a Japanese invasion of Nauru and Ocean Island was feared, the Free French destroyer  departed the New Hebrides to evacuate both places. The ship arrived on 23 February and completed the evacuation without serious incident.

Although Operation MO was cancelled on 8 May 1942 immediately following the Battle of the Coral Sea, the Imperial Japanese Navy forces departed Rabaul and Bougainville on 11 May to execute the RY operation.

First invasion attempt
The invasion troops from the 6th Special Naval Landing Force (SNLF) and Kashima SNLF were carried by the transports Kinryū Maru and Takahata Maru.

While steaming through driving rain off New Ireland and west of Buka Island, Okinoshima, which had been damaged by airplanes from Yorktown during the invasion of Tulagi on 4 May 1942, was torpedoed at 04:52 by the United States Navy submarine  (Commander Oliver G. Kirk) and severely damaged. The invasion force's escorts closed S-42 and depth charged the area until 1130, causing damage. The submarine left the area to return to base at Moreton Bay, Brisbane. Rear Admiral Shima transferred his flag to Yūzuki southwest of Buka Island, Bougainville.

In spite of the loss of Okinoshima, the rest of the Japanese forces continued with the operation. As these forces were en route, however, a Japanese reconnaissance aircraft from Tulagi sighted the United States Navy aircraft carriers  and  heading towards Nauru. The two US carriers, acting on intelligence obtained from intercepted Japanese communications, had been sent to the area as a feint to try to stop the Japanese operation.

The feint was successful. Fearing the threat posed by the US carriers to the RY forces, which did not have air cover, the Japanese cancelled the operation on 15 May, and the naval forces returned to Rabaul.

Second, successful attempt

The landing forces landed on Nauru on 29 August and Ocean Island on 30 August unopposed.

Occupation

Japanese forces occupied the two islands until the end of the war, but became increasingly isolated as the war progressed.

During the Japanese occupation of Nauru, American aircraft repeatedly bombed the island's facilities.

References

Books

Web
 (translation of excerpts from the Senshi Sōshō)

Pacific Ocean theatre of World War II
1942 in Japan
1942 in Nauru
Pacific theatre of World War II
World War II operations and battles of the Pacific theatre
Military operations of World War II
History of Nauru
Wars involving Nauru